Hans Renschler (April 19, 1925 – April 30, 2011), born in Stuttgart, Germany, was a scientist in the field of internal medicine and medical didactics. He was also the founder and director of the Institut für Didaktik der Medizin at the University of Bonn.

Research work
Among his many publications, some stand out: Measuring low levels of glucose in urine to monitor health, meanwhile a routine clinical test, was first standardized and published in 1965 by Renschler.
An obituary  was published 11/15/2011.

References

1925 births
German medical researchers
2011 deaths
Scientists from Stuttgart